Love Honey is the eighth studio album released by Ai Otsuka on 12 April 2017.

Track listing
Track list from Ai's official website.

References

Ai Otsuka albums
Avex Group albums
2017 albums